Valley Lutheran High School may refer to:

 Valley Lutheran High School (Arizona), Phoenix, Arizona
 Valley Lutheran High School (Michigan), Saginaw, Michigan